Matthew Jerome Suhey (born July 7, 1958) is an American former professional football player who was a fullback for ten seasons in the National Football League (NFL) for the Chicago Bears. He won a Super Bowl as a member of the 1985 Bears while scoring a touchdown in the game and was named to the Pennsylvania Football All-Century Team.

Before his NFL career, Suhey played college football at Penn State from 1976-1979, rushing for 2,818 yards and 26 touchdowns, while also catching 39 passes for 328 yards and 2 scores, along with 21 punt returns for 252 yards and another touchdown.

Suhey was the lead blocker and friend of Walter Payton. He is also a close friend of the Payton family, and the executor of the Payton estate since the death of Walter. Although Suhey was never a leader in any statistical category, he was a fan favorite for his personality and blocking ability.

Matt Suhey is one of three sons of College Football Hall of Fame guard Steve Suhey to letter at Penn State University and a grandson of Hall of Fame Penn State player and coach Bob Higgins.  His son, Joe Suhey, was a fullback at Penn State from 2007–2011. The Higgins–Suhey family is often referred to as the "first family of Penn State football" due to their affiliation with the program spanning four generations.

References 

1958 births
Living people
People from State College, Pennsylvania
American football fullbacks
Players of American football from Pennsylvania
Penn State Nittany Lions football players
Chicago Bears players